LET ME TELL YOU A STORY is a 2013 album by the band Random Encounter consisting of 18 songs, contemporary rock arrangements of the music from various video game soundtracks. This represents a fan-made mix between video game covers and original songs inspired by video games. The album boasts many collaborations with artists within the Video Game Music scene, beyond it, and even recordings made with the band's fans.

The album is Random Encounter's second. Promotion for the album was primarily based out of Random Encounter's website, Facebook, Kickstarter, and was supplemented by various tour stops around the United States during their Winter east coast mini tour, as well as regular performances in their home city Orlando, Florida, and an album release show.

Track listing
"The Day After" – 0:50
originally from Final Fantasy VI
"Swamp Witch" – 2:39
an original
 "Frog's Theme" – 1:59
originally from Chrono Trigger
 "Wind Scene" – 2:20
originally from Chrono Trigger
 "Not You" – 3:08
an original inspired by "The Legend of Zelda"
 "Purple Angel" – 5:02
a parody mashup of Purple Haze and One Winged Angel
 "Heart of Fire" – 2:05
originally from Castlevania
 "Cave Story" – 2:14
originally from Cave Story
 "Ocean King" – 2:47
an original
 "Serpent Trench" – 1:25
originally from Final Fantasy VI
 "Katamari on the Rocks" – 3:17
originally from Katamari Damacy
 "Tal Tal Heights" – 1:52
an original inspired by "The Legend of Zelda Link's Awakening"
 "Yoshi's Castle" – 1:59
originally from Yoshi's Island
 "Still More Fighting" – 2:54
originally from Final Fantasy VII
 "Death of a Friend" – 3:38
an original inspired by Final Fantasy IV
 "Slam Shuffle (Zozo)" – 2:19
originally from Final Fantasy VI
 "Another World" – 4:10
an original inspired by "Another World (video game)"
 "Wind Waker" – 3:36
an original inspired by "The Legend of Zelda: The Wind Waker"
The Physical copy of the album contains the hidden track "It Happened Late One Evening" from Secret of Mana.
The album is available for free listening and download on the Random Encounter website.

Personnel
Random Encounter (band)
Careless – accordion, glockenspiel, vocals
Rook – Bass guitar, vocals
Moose – drums, Vocals
Konami – electric guitar, acoustic steel string guitar
Kit – electric guitar
Michael Moore – Mixing
Rob Kleiner – Mastering

“Guest artists”
Dr. Wily The NESkimos – Vocals
Phil Robertson – Drums
Under Polaris – Chiptune
Stemage of Metroid Metal – electric guitar
brentalfloss – vocals
Amanda Lepre – vocals
Helios – piano
Joseph Sanzo – trumpet
Mike Trebner – sitar
Travis Morgan – vocals
The Random Encounter Geek Easy Chorus – vocals

Reception
Let Me Tell You a Story has been given critical acclaim by Almost Nerdy, Nerdy Show, Destructoid.com. and Russian magazine Mir Fantastiki

See also
Video game music culture

References

External links
Random Encounter's homepage
Random Encounter's Facebook

2013 albums
Video game soundtracks
Tribute albums
Random Encounter (band) albums